The 1997 FIBA European Championship for Cadettes was the 12th edition of the European basketball championship for U16 women's teams, today known as FIBA U16 Women's European Championship. 12 teams featured in the competition, held in Sopron, Hungary, from 18 to 27 July 1997.

Russia won their third title in a row.

Qualification
19 countries entered the qualification round. They were divided in three groups. The top three teams of each group qualified for the main tournament.

Hungary (as host), Russia (as incumbent champion) and Italy (as incumbent runner-up) received a bye to the main tournament and did not play in the qualification round.

Group A
The games were played in Gabrovo, Bulgaria, from August 12 to 16, 1996.

Group B
The games were played in Žďár nad Sázavou, the Czech Republic, from August 18 to 24, 1996.

Group C
The games were played in Timișoara, Romania, from August 13 to 17, 1996.

Qualified teams
The following twelve teams qualified for the final tournament.

Preliminary round
In the preliminary round, the twelve teams were allocated in two groups of six teams each. The top four teams of each group advanced to the quarter-finals. The last two teams of each group qualified for the 9th-12th playoffs.

Group A

Group B

Playoffs

9th-12th playoff

Championship playoff

5th-8th playoff

Final standings

Statistical leaders

Points

Rebounds

Assists

Notes

References

External links
Official Site

1997
1997–98 in European women's basketball
1997 in Hungarian sport
International youth basketball competitions hosted by Hungary
International women's basketball competitions hosted by Hungary